Washburn Lake is a lake in the U.S. state of Wisconsin.

Washburn Lake was named after the local Washburn family.

References

Lakes of Wisconsin
Bodies of water of Portage County, Wisconsin